These are the people who, at one time or another, had been considered, announced, declined or withdrew his or her candidacy in the 2016 Philippine Senate election.

Qualified candidates
These are the commission's approved candidates as of January 21, 2016:

References

2016 Philippine general election